Lane Wyatt Martin is an American chemical engineer. He is a professor in the Department of Materials Science and Engineering at the University of California, Berkeley.

Early life and education
Martin was born and raised in rural western Pennsylvania. He chose to enroll at Carnegie Mellon University for his undergraduate degree in business but eventually switched to material science. Following this, he completed his Master's degree in 2006 and PhD in 2008 from the University of California, Berkeley.

Career
Following his PhD, Martin served as a Postdoctoral Fellow in the Quantum Materials Program at Lawrence Berkeley National Laboratory before accepting a faculty position at the University of Illinois Urbana-Champaign. As an assistant professor of materials science and engineering, Martin received a National Science Foundation CAREER Award for his proposal, "Enhanced Pyroelectric and Electrocaloric Effects in Complex Oxide Thin Film Heterostructures." He also helped devise a method to make thin films of ferroelectric material with twice the strain of traditional methods, giving the films exceptional electric properties. In 2013, Martin was nominated for a Presidential Early Career Award for Scientists and Engineers by the United States Department of Defense "for his research accomplishments in the synthesis and study of multifunctional materials that have enabled the development and understanding of fundamentally new materials phenomena and potential for advanced devices."

In 2014, Martin returned to his alma mater, the University of California, Berkeley, as a faculty member in their Department of Materials Science and Engineering. As an associate professor of materials science and engineering, Martin oversaw a research team that found a way to control the movement and placement of electrons in graphene. While serving in this role, he received the 2015 American Associate for Crystal Growth Young Author Award for his "outstanding accomplishments in the heteroepitaxial crystal growth of complex oxide thin films." He also received the 2016 Robert L. Coble Award for Young Scholars from the American Ceramic Society for outstanding contributions in ceramics research. In 2021, Martin was elected to the American Physical Society for his seminal contributions to the science of ferroelectrics.

Personal life
Martin and his wife Sophi have one son together.

References

External links

Living people
Scientists from Pennsylvania
American chemical engineers
Carnegie Mellon University alumni
University of California, Berkeley alumni
University of California, Berkeley faculty
University of Illinois Urbana-Champaign faculty
Fellows of the American Physical Society
Year of birth missing (living people)